The Shire of Menzies is a local government area in the Goldfields-Esperance region of Western Australia, located to the north of Kalgoorlie.

History

The Shire of Menzies originated as the Menzies Road District, which was established on 31 May 1912 after the subdivision of the North Coolgardie Road District into three separate road districts (Menzies, Kookynie and Mt Malcolm). The North Coolgardie Road District had absorbed three municipalities on 1 March 1912, including the Municipality of Menzies covering the Menzies township, but had quickly proven too large and cumbersome to administer and was broken up.

The Kookynie Road District merged into the Menzies Road District in mid-1918.

The Menzies Road District became a shire on 1 July 1961 under the Local Government Act 1960, which reformed all remaining road districts into shires.

Wards
The shire is divided into three wards:

 Menzies Ward (three councillors)
 Kookynie Ward (three councillors)
 Ularring Ward (one councillor)

Towns and localities
The towns and localities of the Shire of Menzies with population and size figures based on the most recent Australian census:

Abandoned and ghost towns
Abandoned and ghost towns in the Shire of Menzies:

 Callion
 Comet Vale
 Davyhurst
 Goongarrie
 Linden
 Mount Ida
 Mulline
 Mulwarrie
 Niagara
 Tampa
 Yarri
 Yerilla
 Yunndaga

Heritage-listed places

As of 2023, 44 places are heritage-listed in the Shire of Menzies, of which 13 are on the State Register of Heritage Places.

References

External links
 

 
Menzies